Dandelion Wine is a 1957 novel by Ray Bradbury, based on a 1953 short story, also by Bradbury, of the same title.

Dandelion Wine may also refer to:

 a type of fruit wine

Entertainment
Dandelion Wine (film), a 1997 Russian TV movie based on the novel
Dandelion Wine (band), a musical trio based in Melbourne, Victoria, Australia
"Dandelion Wine", a song by The Hollies from their 1970 album Confessions of the Mind
"Dandelion Wine", a folk song performed by Makem and Clancy from their 1980 album The Makem & Clancy Collection
"Dandelion Wine", a song by Blackmore's Night from their 2003 album Ghost of a Rose
"Dandelion Wine", a song by Ron Sexsmith from his 2004 album Retriever
"Dandelion Wine", a song by Gregory Alan Isakov from his 2009 album This Empty Northern Hemisphere
"Dandelion Wine", a song by Thrice from their 2021 album Horizons/East